The following is a list of major desktop publishing software. A wide range of related software tools exist in this field including many plug-ins and tools related to the applications listed below.

Several software directories provide more comprehensive listings of desktop publishing software, including VersionTracker and Tucows.

Free software 
This section lists free software which does desktop publishing. All of these are required to be open-source. While not required, the software listed in this section is available free of charge. (In principle, in rare cases, free software is sold without being distributed over the Internet.)

Desktop publishing software for Windows, macOS, Linux and other operating systems 
 Collabora Online Draw and Collabora Online Writer. The applications for Windows, macOS, Linux and ChromeOS are also known as Collabora Office.
 LibreOffice Draw and LibreOffice Writer for Windows, macOS, Linux, BSDs and others
 LyX for Windows, MacOS, Linux, UNIX, OS/2 and Haiku, based on the LaTeX typesetting system, initial release in 1995
 Scribus for Windows, macOS, Linux, BSD, Unix, Haiku, OS/2, based on the free Qt toolkit, initial release in 2003

Online desktop publishing software 
 Collabora Online Draw and Collabora Online Writer
 Scenari, open source single-source publishing tool with support for chain publication

Proprietary

Desktop publishing software for Windows 

 XEditpro Automated Publishing Tool - DiacriTech, 1997
 Adobe InDesign
 Adobe FrameMaker
 Adobe PageMaker, discontinued in 2004
 Affinity Publisher
 CatBase
 Calamus
 CorelDRAW
 Corel Ventura, previously Ventura Publisher, originally developed by Xerox, now owned by Corel
 FrameMaker, now owned by Adobe
 InPage - DTP which works with English + Urdu, Arabic, Persian, Pashto etc.
 MadCap Flare
 Microsoft Publisher
 PageStream, formerly known as Publishing Partner
 Prince XML, by YesLogic
 QuarkXPress
 RagTime
 Ready, Set, Go!
 Xara Designer Pro X
 Xara Page & Layout Designer

Desktop publishing software for macOS 

 Adobe InDesign
 Adobe PageMaker, discontinued in 2004
 Affinity Publisher
 CatBase
 iCalamus
 iStudio Publisher – desktop publishing and page layout software for Mac OS X
 Pages, by Apple, Inc.
 QuarkXPress
 Ready, Set, Go!
 Print Shop, originally produced by Broderbund

Online desktop publishing software 

 Canva
 Fatpaint
 Lucidpress – desktop publishing and page layout software that is web-based and collaborative.
 Piktochart
 Infogram

Retired 
 AppleWorks for Mac and Windows
 Calamus - for Atari TOS-based computers
 geoPublish - for the Commodore 64
 Timeworks Publisher
 Impression and Impression Publisher - for the  Acorn Archimedes
 Corel Ventura

See also 
 Comparison of desktop publishing software

References

External links 
 Comparison of DTP Features
 Multilingual desktop publishing tools

Desktop publishing